Duncan Peder McKenzie Jr. (October 5, 1951 – May 10, 1995) was convicted of the murder of a Conrad, Montana schoolteacher named Lana Harding on January 21, 1974. After his conviction in March 1975, he was on death row for twenty years, receiving eight stays of execution. His ninth stay of execution was denied by the United States courts of appeals.

McKenzie was executed on May 10, 1995. He was the first person executed in Montana since 1943, and also the first ever U.S. death row inmate to spend twenty years or more on death row and still eventually be executed. He is one of only three people to have been executed in Montana since the reinstatement of the death penalty. He was the only person of the three to be executed involuntarily.

Background
McKenzie was born on October 5, 1951, in Chicago, Illinois. He was also widowed.

Crime overview
He was convicted of the murder, rape, and death by asphyxia of Lana Harding. He was sentenced to death for aggravated kidnapping. The crime was committed on January 21, 1974, in the early morning. Harding was a schoolteacher in a small one-classroom schoolhouse and members of the community raised concerns of her well being when she did not arrive at the school and her shoes were left in the driveway.

Suspicions
He was also suspected to have murdered Debra Prety, a teenager from Coeur d'Alene. However, at the date of his execution, McKenzie had never confessed to the murder of Prety or Harding. At the time of Prety's death he lived relatively close to the family home and was on parole for attacking another woman. Three months after the death of Prety, McKenzie committed the murder of Harding.

Death row
He waited on death row for twenty years from 1975 to 1995. He was one of the first three inmates to be sentenced with the reinstated death penalty in Montana. The other two sentenced were Bernard Fitzpatrick and Dewey Coleman, however, their appeals to the execution were successful and they avoided death.

Execution
McKenzie was executed on May 10, 1995, at Montana State Prison, becoming the first person to be executed in Montana since 1943. His last meal was tenderloin steak, french fries, a tossed salad, orange sherbet and whole milk. Upon his request, he was allowed to listen to country music as he was put to death. McKenzie remains the first of only three people to be executed in Montana since the resumption of capital punishment. The others were Terry Allen Langford in 1998 and David Thomas Dawson in 2006. McKenzie was the only one of the three to be executed involuntarily.

See also
 Capital punishment in Montana
 Capital punishment in the United States
 List of people executed in Montana

References

1951 births
1995 deaths
20th-century executions by Montana
20th-century executions of American people
American people executed for murder
American people convicted of rape
Executed people from Illinois
People convicted of murder by Montana
People executed by Montana by lethal injection
People from Chicago